West Branch Little Black River may refer to:

 West Branch Little Black River (Michigan), a tributary of the Little Black River in Cheboygan County
 West Branch Little Black River (Wisconsin), a tributary of the Little Black River in Taylor County
 West Branch Little Black River (Quebec-Maine), a tributary of the Little Black River in Quebec, Canada, and northern Maine, USA

See also 
 Little Black River (disambiguation)
 Black River (disambiguation)